Arroyo Seco is a city in the province of Santa Fe, Argentina. Its name (literally "dry stream") is the same as a neighbouring creek. The city is located on the western shore of the Paraná River and can be reached also by National Route 9 (Argentina), Provincial Route 21, and the Nuevo Central Argentino railway line.

The original name "Pueblo Aguirre" was soon replaced by "Pueblo Arroyo Seco".

Arroyo Seco became a city on 12 April 1962. It is also where Lionel Messi was born.

References
 Municipality of Arroyo Seco – Official website.
 Community of Arroyo Seco – Community of Arroyo Seco.
 
 

Populated places in Santa Fe Province